Mike Ceresia is a Canadian retired racquetball player from Sarnia, Ontario. He was a member of five Canadian teams that won gold at the Racquetball World Championships, which is the most gold medals won by a Canadian at the International Racquetball Federation (IRF) World Championships. He also won 10 Canadian Championships (two singles and eight doubles).

International career 
Ceresia represented Canada on 18 occasions between 1988 and 2002, including eight consecutive World Championships during that period.

His lowest finish at the World Championships was fourth.

Ceresia was a member on the Canadian men's team that won gold four times: 1988, 1996, 2000 and 2002, as well as a gold medal for Overall/Combined Team in 2000. Ceresia and his partners won the deciding match for the men's team title in 1988, 2000 and 2002. These three clinching victories were over the United States.

Ceresia was the men's doubles silver medalist at Worlds on four occasions: in 1988 with Paul Shanks, in 1990 with Ross Harvey, in 1996 with Simon Roy, and in 2002 with  Mike Green. Ceresia was also a World silver medallist in men's singles in 1994.

Ceresia was a Pan American Games silver medalist in the Men's Team event in Mar Del Plata, Argentina in 1995.

Canadian career
Ceresia was the Canadian Champion in Men's Singles twice: in 1992 and in 1997. He was Canadian National Doubles Champion in Men's Doubles on eight occasions.

His first two doubles titles were back to back in 1988 with Roger Harripersad and 1989 with Paul Shanks. He next won in 1993 with Jacques Demers. Ceresia's most successful partnership was with Simon Roy. They won three consecutive championships, from 1995 to 1997. Ceresia won in 2000 with Mike Green and his final championship came in 2002 with Gary Waite.

His 10 Canadian Championships tie him for third most men's championships with Sherman Greenfeld.

Ceresia signed Kane Waselenchuk (current World Number 1) to his first major racquetball contract.

Personal life
Ceresia has a BA from the University of Western Ontario in London, Ontario.

He was inducted into the Sarnia-Lambton Sports Hall of Fame in 2008,

He was inducted into the Racquetball Canada Hall of Fame in May 2018.

Ceresia is married to his wife Claudine. They have two children and live in Burlington, Ontario.

References

Canadian racquetball players
1963 births
Living people
Sportspeople from Burlington, Ontario
Sportspeople from Sarnia
Pan American Games medalists in racquetball
Pan American Games silver medalists for Canada
Racquetball players at the 1995 Pan American Games
Medalists at the 1995 Pan American Games